Olivier Saladin is a French actor. He is best known for playing in the cult TV series Les Deschiens (1993-2002), in which he plays alongside Yolande Moreau.

Filmography

Theater

References

External links 

French male film actors
Living people
20th-century French male actors
21st-century French male actors
Male actors from Le Havre
Year of birth missing (living people)